Project 6 Cyclemind  is the 5th album of the Filipino  band, 6cyclemind. Having 12 tracks, it was released by Musiko Records & Sony Music Philippines  in 2009.

It was the last album to Feature Ney Dimaculangan as the band's vocalist before leaving the band and went solo.

Track listing

Trivia
The song 'Alapaap' originally song by the band Eraserheads and was included in The Eraserheads tribute album Ultraelectromagneticjam. 
Three of the song originally written by the band (Walang Iwanan, Mahiwagang Pag-Ibig, Pangarap) was recorded by other Artists. the carrier single "Walang Iwanan" was interpreted by the band 'Pop Filter'. The song 'Mahiwagang Pag-Ibig' was interpreted by Pinoy Big Brother Teen Edition alumnus Aldred Gatchalian for the ABS-CBN afternoon series Love Spell, and "Pangarap," interpreted by Karel Marquez which was also used in a Koreanovela.
The song  "Sagot Kita". was used as a theme for the ABS-CBN Foundation.
The song "Noon at Ngayon?" was used as a jingle for Tanduay.

References

6cyclemind albums
2009 albums